The Type 333 Kulmbach class is a class of five German Navy ships. Built as Type 343 Hameln class minesweepers, they have been upgraded to minehunters using Seefuchs expendable drones to detonate detected naval mines.

List of ships

Notes: The listed commission dates are from their original commission as Type 343 boats since they were not formally recommissioned after their upgrade to Type 333 mine hunters.

The ships currently belong to the 3. Minensuchgeschwader (3rd Minesweeping Squadron) based in Kiel at the Baltic Sea.

References

External links
 Marine-Portraits 

Minehunters of the German Navy